V352 Aurigae is a variable star in the northern constellation of Auriga. It dimly visible to the naked eye with an apparent visual magnitude that ranges from 6.13 down to 6.18. According to the Bortle scale, it is faintly visible to the naked eye from dark rural skies. The star is located at a distance of approximately 970 light years from the Sun based on parallax, but is drifting closer with a radial velocity of −7 km/s.

The stellar classification of this star is A9III, which matches an A-type star with the luminosity class of an evolved giant star. It is listed as a spectral standard for stars of that class, although other researchers have classed it as F0II-III or F1IV. 

The star has 13 times the radius of the Sun and is radiating 242 times the Sun's luminosity from its photosphere at an effective temperature of 6,350 K.  It is unusually luminous for a Delta Scuti variable. It is also suspected of being a chemically peculiar star of the Delta Delphini type, although the anomalies are not pronounced.

References

External links
 HR 2557
 Image V352 Aurigae

A-type giants
Delta Scuti variables
Auriga (constellation)
Durchmusterung objects
050420
033269
2557
Aurigae, V352